Sergeant James I. Mestrovitch (May 22, 1894 – November 4, 1918) was a United States Army soldier who received the Medal of Honor, America's highest military decoration, for his valiant actions in World War I.

Biography
Mestrovitch, an ethnic Serb, was born as Joko Meštrović in Đuraševići near Tivat, Kingdom of Dalmatia, Austria-Hungary (modern-day Montenegro) and after immigrating to the United States in 1911 he lived in Fresno, California. He enlisted in the Pennsylvania Army National Guard's 18th Infantry in 1916 Pittsburgh, Pennsylvania. Following his enlistment Private Mestrovich was deployed along the Mexican Border in support of the 1916 Punitive expedition with the Pennsylvania National Guard where his skill and experience as a soldier saw him promoted to corporal. Mestrovich was interviewed by newspaper reporters and attributed his patriotism and service as a debt repaid for the work of American doctors treating the typhoid epidemic in his native Serbia in 1914, the same year World War I began in Europe.

On April 13, 1917, a week after the American entry into World War I, the 18th Pennsylvania Infantry was called to federal to guard vital wartime industry in western Pennsylvania. A short time later, the men found themselves shipped to Camp Hancock, Georgia. Here, the Pittsburgh Regiment joined with the men of the 6th Pennsylvania Infantry from Philadelphia and surrounding counties to form the new 111th Infantry Regiment, part of the 28th Division. The division was deployed overseas to the Western Front in May 1918.

On August 10, 1918, while his unit was engaged in the town of Fismette, France Sergeant Mestrovich saw his company commander, Captain James Williams, fall wounded as they moved through the ruins of the city. Without regard for his own safety, Mestrovich charged forward through a hail of machine-gun fire and falling artillery shells to rescue his Captain, returning to a concealed position to provide life-saving first aid. For this action, he would become the 28th Division's first Medal of Honor recipient. Mestrovich was wounded in the fighting where he performed his heroic deed and initially reported as killed in action. He wrote to his uncle back in Fresno to tell him of being shot by machine-gun fire and recuperating in the hospital, stating, "They operated twice on me, and in another month I think I will be just as good as I was and ready for the front again."

Mestrovich did recover and return to the 111th Infantry, but he would not survive the war to receive recognition for his heroic deeds in the streets of Fismette. As the fighting raged in the Meuse Argonne, Sergeant James Mestrovich fell in action on November 4, 1918, with nearly 50 other men from the 111th, when their battalion encountered a concealed machine gun position during a reconnaissance patrol just a week before the Armistice with Germany which ended hostilities.

Sergeant Mestrovich's Medal of Honor citation reads as follows:

Sergeant James Mestrovich was returned home to his mother in 1925 in the town of Boka, now part of Montenegro. He was buried in the cemetery of Serbian Orthodox Church of St. John in his home village of Đuraševići near Tivat. That same year the US mission to Split visited Mestrovich's mother and presented her with his Medal of Honor in the presence of a full honor guard.

See also

List of Medal of Honor recipients for World War I

References

External links

1894 births
1918 deaths
People from Tivat
Serbs of Montenegro
Austro-Hungarian emigrants to the United States
United States Army non-commissioned officers
United States Army personnel of World War I
United States Army Medal of Honor recipients
Foreign-born Medal of Honor recipients
World War I recipients of the Medal of Honor
American people of Serbian descent
Burials at Serbian Orthodox monasteries and churches
Burials in Montenegro
American military personnel killed in World War I